The women's super-G competition of the Vancouver 2010 Olympics was held at Whistler Creekside in Whistler, British Columbia, on Saturday, February 20.

Andrea Fischbacher of Austria won the gold medal, Tina Maze of Slovenia took the silver, and the bronze medalist was Lindsey Vonn of the United States, who had won gold in the downhill.

Results
Saturday, February 20, 2010

The race was started at 10:00 local time, (UTC −8).

References

External links
 2010 Winter Olympics results: Ladies' Super-G, from https://web.archive.org/web/20091025194336/http://www.vancouver2010.com/; retrieved 2010-02-19.

Results
FIS results

Super-G
Winter Olympics